Inquizition is an American game show created by Game Show Network and Sande Stewart Television that ran on the network's schedule from October 5, 1998 to October 19, 2001. The game, hosted by an unknown figure named "The Inquizitor", features four contestants competing in a quiz competition against four home viewers who participated by telephone calls.

Gameplay
Four players competed in a studio which, from the opening credits sequence, appeared to be a large airplane hangar. In reality, the show was recorded in a small studio, using a blue screen backdrop on which images of the hangar were superimposed. Additionally, four more contestants played along at home against each other in a parallel game over the telephone (one of several shows on GSN that did this). Studio players wore black T-shirts under smocks in various colors, and would bow to the Inquizitor when first introduced.

The game was played in three rounds, each consisting of approximately 20-25 multiple-choice questions depending on the time available. Each question had three possible answers (A, B, or C; "C" was almost always "none of the above"). The contestants had three seconds to lock in an answer by pressing one of the buttons on their podiums, their answers visible only to the Inquizitor and viewing audience. Each correct response awarded one point, with no penalty for wrong answers; the scores were displayed on the podiums after each question, but were not announced at any point during gameplay.

When time expired at the end of each round, the contestant with the lowest score was eliminated and dismissed by the Inquizitor. The losing player turned around, as if to walk away, and the screen faded to white. The scores were reset for each new round. After Round 3, the remaining contestant collected his/her "papers" (a prop sometimes seen briefly on-camera, similar to a diploma) and a $500 cash prize ($250 in Season 1). Telephone contestants played for the same prize as the studio contestants, with some also winning online gift certificates.

In the case of a tie in either the show or the telephone game, additional questions were asked until the tie was broken.

The Inquizitor
Inquizitions mysterious anti-host, the Inquizitor, was not a typical game show host of the time – he was angry, cranky, and had little patience for wrong answers. He rarely called contestants by their first names, instead opting to use a more gentlemanly approach ("Mr. Roberts", "Miss Johnson"). During the game, he was seen only from behind as a figure in a dark business suit with shoulder-length gray hair, seated in a chair next to a table that held a glass of water and an hourglass.

Frequently, the Inquizitor would express his disdain for under-performing players during questioning and prod them to improve their game – or occasionally praise a player, while giving backhanded insults to the others ("Thank you, [contestant], for saving us from almost complete''' ignorance"). He occasionally threw in a side comment on the correct answer, i.e. "The first centerfold for Playboy magazine was... A. Marilyn Monroe. I still have my copy."

The Inquizitor's remarks could have an effect on gameplay, as they were the only indication contestants had of where they stood against their opponents. At the end of each round, the Inquizitor dismissed the player in last place with annoyance or indifference ("Please leave now."; "Goodbye."; "Get out!"), and usually scorned the eliminated player in Round 3 by shouting "You have failed!". The eliminated player would turn their back to the camera as they left, and the screen faded to white (instead of black).

At the end of the show, the Inquizitor would walk out of the hangar and cackle menacingly.

Identity
The Inquizitor never showed his face during the show's three-year run (although he has a grey beard) and as of 2023, his identity remains unknown because of stipulations in his contract.

See also100%'' (A similar game show that aired in limited syndication in the US in 1999; and on Five in the UK from 1997–2001)

References

1990s American game shows
1998 American television series debuts
2000s American game shows
2001 American television series endings
Game Show Network original programming